Hadi Wihardja (born 24 January 1962) is an Indonesian former weightlifter. He competed in the men's bantamweight event at the 1984 Summer Olympics.

References

External links
 

1962 births
Living people
Indonesian male weightlifters
Olympic weightlifters of Indonesia
Weightlifters at the 1984 Summer Olympics
Place of birth missing (living people)
20th-century Indonesian people
21st-century Indonesian people